Lai Kew Chai (7 February 1941 – 27 February 2006) was a Malaysian-born Singaporean judge and the longest-serving member of the Supreme Court Bench, having served for almost 25 years as a Judge.

Biography

Early life and education
Born in Tanjung Malim, Perak, he received his early education at Methodist English School at his hometown in 1950, and at the Methodist Boys' School, Kuala Lumpur in 1955.
Lai was an exceptional student in school, excelling as a school captain and in his studies. He received a School Book Prize for best HSC results for his final year examinations in 1961, and from there went on to read law at the University of Singapore in March 1962, with a University Entrance Scholarship. He continued to shine in his academic results, received a Book Prize for his first-year results in March 1963 and graduated with Honours in 1966.

Legal career

Upon graduation that year, he was admitted to the Singapore Bar on 14 December and began his career with the law firm Lee & Lee.  In 1971 Lai become a full partner of the firm.

In his 13 years' private practice with the firm, he was very active member in the legal fraternity, having served as Honorary Director of the Postgraduate Practical Law Course and a member of the Military Court of Appeal between 1977 and 1981, and as vice-president of the Law Society of Singapore between 1980 and 1981.

On 1 July 1981, he was appointed to the High Court at the age of 40, making him the youngest judge to be appointed to the High Court in Singapore. In 1989, he was made Senate Member and executive committee member of the Singapore Academy of Law. Justice Lai was appointed Chairman of the Legal Education and Studies Committee of the academy from 19 January 1989 to 28 July 1995, and Chairman of the Professional Affairs Committee, Singapore Academy of Law from 24 July 1993 until his retirement on 6 February 2006. – on his 65th birthday.

High-profile court cases by Lai Kew Chai
In his 25-year career, Justice Lai heard many high-profile cases, and made many contributions in the legal arena. In 1982, he issued the first written decision on the granting of a Mareva injunction in Singapore in the Art Trend Ltd v Blue Dolphin (Pte) Ltd case.

In October 1984, Justice Lai presided the manslaughter trial of Beh Meng Chai, a Malaysian and one of the three perpetrators of the 1980 Jurong fishing port murders, in which a fisher dealer Lee Cheng Tiong and a teenager Teo Keng Siang were both robbed and killed. Beh was initially charged with murder after his capture in 1982, but after Beh made a plea bargain and expressed his willingness to be the prosecution witness in the trial of his accomplice Sim Min Teck, the prosecution proceeded with two reduced charges of manslaughter (also known as culpable homicide not amounting to murder) against Beh, who pleaded guilty. Justice Lai sentenced Beh to life in prison and 24 strokes of the cane in October 1984, and he stated in his verdict that the brutality of the killings were so abhorrent that it justified the imposition of the maximum punishment for manslaughter in Beh's case, despite noting his young age and full cooperation with the police. As for Sim, he was sentenced to death and hanged for murder, but till today, the third and final accomplice Chng Meng Joo was never caught for the murders.

On 14 August 1985, Justice Lai, together with High Court judge Abdul Wahab Ghows, heard the case of Sek Kim Wah, a Singaporean serial killer responsible for five murders between June and July 1983, consisting of the Seletar Reservoir double killings and the Andrew Road triple murders. During sentencing, Justice Lai, who delivered the verdict, rejected Sek's defence of diminished responsibility (he claimed that he suffered from anti-social personality disorder and psychopathic personality disorder which diminished his responsibility of his crimes) and found him in full control of his faculties at the time of the killing. Sek was hanged on 9 December 1988 after the dismissal of his appeal against the conviction and sentence. Sek's Malaysian accomplice Nyu Kok Meng, who never harmed or killed a single victim, was charged under the Arms Offences Act in a separate trial for committing armed robbery with a rifle, and sentenced to life imprisonment and 6 strokes of the cane.

In 1986, Justice Lai sentenced Malaysian businessman and the then-MCA President Tan Koon Swan to a S$500,000 fine and two years' imprisonment in Singapore, for Criminal Breach of Trust (CBT) which led to the collapse of Singaporean company Pan-Electric Industries. In his judgement, Lai said Tan's offences had "struck at the very heart, integrity, reputation and confidence of Singapore as a commercial city and financial centre". Tan's sentence was later reduced to 14 months, and he was released on 26 December 1987.

Lai was also one of the two judges (the other being Joseph Grimberg) who sentenced Sim Ah Cheoh, a housewife and single mother of two sons, and her two bosses - Lim Joo Yin and Ronald Tan Chong Ngee - to death in 1988 for attempting to illegally import 1.37 kg of heroin from Singapore to the USA. Sim was later granted clemency and her sentence commuted to life imprisonment in 1992, while both Lim and Tan were executed.

In November 1990, Justice Lai and another judge, Judicial commissioner (JC) Tan Teow Yeow, heard the case of Hensley Anthony Neville, a Singaporean fugitive caught in Malaysia in March 1987 for the 1984 rape and murder of Lim Hwee Huang, a 19-year-old interior designer who was thrown to her death from Neville's flat at Kallang Bahru. Neville was reportedly the first person to represent himself without a lawyer during a murder trial in Singapore. Although Neville argued that the sexual activity was consensual and that Lim could have either accidentally or suicidally fell to her death, both Justice Lai and JC Tan rejected Neville's account and found that he had "wilfully and cruelly" killed Lim after he forcibly had sex with her, and hence sentenced him to death on 22 November 1990. Neville was eventually hanged on 28 August 1992.

In the case of Thahir v Pertamina (1992), the Indonesian petroleum conglomerate presented substantial claims to over S$60 million deposit in various accounts with Sumitomo Bank in Singapore, and belonging to the late General Achmad Thahir, a former General Assistant to Pertamina's President-Director, General Ibnu Sutowo. Much of the deposits were deemed to be kickbacks from corruption practices by the General Thahir, during his office in Pertamina between 14 October 1968 and the day of his death on 23 July 1976. Justice Lai thus allowed Pertamina's claims to be passed and the decision was upheld by the Court of Appeal.
The judgement passed by him deeply impressed The Privy Council in Britain, and formally accepted Lai's rejection of exercising an English legal authority on the Commonwealth corruption law that had been upheld for more than a century.

Between March 1993 and December 1993, Justice Lai presided the three-week murder trial of Lim Lye Hock, who was charged with raping and murdering his 30-year-old childhood friend Tan Hui Ngin in October 1990. Out of the witnesses called, Lim's wife said that her husband had confessed to killing Tan by using a brick to bludgeon her on the head until she died. Overruling the defence's objection to call Lim's wife as a prosecution witness, Justice Lai ruled that while marital communication between a wife and husband may be privileged and cannot be disclosed, a defendant's spouse had the right to come to court on its summon to testify against the defendant during a criminal proceeding, reagrdless of whether the evidence incriminates the spouse or not. In the end, Lim was found guilty of murder on 1 December 1993 and sentenced to death.

In January 1995, Justice Lai also tried a Singaporean fugitive named S. S. Asokan for killing a loan shark. Asokan and another man named Maniam Rathinswamy had committed the crime by using an axe and knife to kill 32-year-old Tan Heng Hong at a hospital, before they moved Tan's body into his car and set it on fire at Mandai. While Maniam was arrested and sentenced to death in 1993, Asokan was arrested and detained for a robbery case in Malaysia before being sent back to Singapore for trial. Asokan was later found guilty and sentenced to death. On the morning of 8 September 1995, both Asokan and Maniam were hanged at Changi Prison.

On 24 June 1995, Justice Lai found mechanic Nadasan Chandra Secharan guilty of murdering his lover Ramapiram Kannickaisparry and sentenced him to death. Ramapiram was stabbed thirteen times and ran over several times by a vehicle, which led to her sustaining rib and pelvis fractures, and a broken tooth belonging to her led to Nadasan being arrested and charged for the brutal murder. However, the Court of Appeal found that Nadasan was not involved in the murder and decided that he indeed had an alibi, leading to Nadasan being acquitted in January 1997.

On 12 May 2005, Singapore saw for the first time, a case involving exercise rights of discretion in the amendment of patent specifications for commercial products in the Trek Technology (Singapore) Pte Ltd v. FE Global Electronics PTE Ltd and others, and other suits [2005] (SGHC 90) Justice Lai ruled on all counts, in favour of Trek 2000 International that their USB portable mass storage device patent to be valid, enforceable and infringed by Israel's M-Systems Flash Disk Pioneers Ltd, and Hong Kong's Ritronics Components.

Justice Lai's last major case heard was that of the sexual assault cum murder of 8-year-old Chinese national Huang Na on 26 August 2005, by the accused Took Leng How. He ruled all forensic evidence pointed to Took's guilt and to his admission of sexual assault and murder of Huang Na, as well as dismissing Took's defence that he was schizophrenic. Took was hanged in Changi Prison on Friday, 3 November 2006 before dawn.

Personal life and death
Lai Kew Chai was an active church worker and an avid traveller. In his lifetime, he was made Honorary Secretary to the Parochial Church Council of St. John's – St. Margaret's Church from 1973 to 1978, and a member of the Council between 1978 and 1981. He was also a Registrar of the Diocese of Singapore, appointed by The Bishop of Singapore.

Lai Kew Chai died at 11.36 a.m., after a seven-month battle against stomach cancer. He left behind his wife, Dorothy and two children Stanley, 37, and Amy, 32, both lawyers, and two granddaughters Lauren, 7 and Chloe, 2 (now both grown up as of 2017).

Quotes
 I remember I went with him in his vintage Mercedes Benz to the nearby shopping centre to buy groceries for the dinner. But when we walked to the payment counter, there stood the Singapore politician J.B. Jeyaretnam whom Lai had earlier ordered to pay Singapore Prime Minister Lee Kuan Yew damages for defamation amounting to about SGD$260,000. Fearing that the encounter might turn out to be a rather awkward one, the tense situation became a subdued one when Lai gave a polite smile to the politician. Such were his humility, friendliness, and most of all his kindness in sponsoring the event for the cash-strapped students who had yet even to start their pupillage. – Malaysian Bar Councillor, Roger Tan Kor Mee
 Justice Lai was undoubtedly a strong and fair judge, always anxious to do justice to the parties, whether it was a civil case or a criminal trial. He was sound in the law and was always prepared to take in arguments from a fresh perspective … It was abundantly clear that as a Judge, Justice Lai was held in high regard by members of the Bar. He was similarly held by his colleagues on the Bench. – Justice Chao Hick Tin, in his eulogy delivered at Justice Lai's funeral at St Andrew's Cathedral on Friday, 3 March 2006.
 One of our finest judges, he was respected for his sharp mind, patience and fairness. He was always on top of every case, and very often offered perspectives that were not very readily apparent to lawyers appearing before him – Lawyer Mr Davinder Singh of Drew & Napier.
...Justice Lai gave up a successful and lucrative career as a lawyer to become a judge, at a time when judges were paid much less than now – so he made a real sacrifice ... He was an excellent trial judge, and made several lasting contributions to our jurisprudence. But despite his seniority, he was never unkind to lawyers and retained his essential humanity. – Senior Counsel Michael Hwang.
Justice Lai made great efforts to guide junior members of the Bar at every possible opportunity in and out of court ... I had the privilege of being his colleague on the High Court Bench upon my appointment as judicial commissioner. He was a friend and mentor in my five years there. – Second Solicitor-General Lee Seiu Kin.
Justice Lai was the only High Court judge to type notes on his laptop in recent years – the only person in the Bench who kept up with technological trends... – civil litigation lawyer Foo Soon Yien.

References

1941 births
2006 deaths
Malaysian emigrants to Singapore
People who lost Malaysian citizenship
Naturalised citizens of Singapore
Singaporean people of Hakka descent
20th-century Singaporean judges
National University of Singapore alumni
Singaporean Anglicans
Judges of the Supreme Court of Singapore
21st-century Singaporean judges